Live at the Village Vanguard is an album by Chucho Valdés, released through Blue Note Records in 2000. In 2001, the album won Valdés the Grammy Award for Best Latin Jazz Album.

Track listing
 "Anabis" (Valdés) – 9:44
 "Son XXI (Para Pia)" (Ubieta) – 5:27
 "Punto Cubano" (Valdés) – 6:18
 "My Funny Valentine" (Lorenz Hart, Richard Rodgers) – 5:37
 "To Bud Powell" (Valdés) – 10:45
 "Drume Negrita" (Grenet) – 5:31
 "Como Traigo la Yuca" (Rodriquez) – 6:36
 "Ponle la Clave" (Valdés) – 9:36
 "Encore-Lorraine's Habanera" (Valdés) – 3:49

References

Chucho Valdés albums
2000 live albums
Grammy Award for Best Latin Jazz Album
Albums recorded at the Village Vanguard